The LVTP-5 (landing vehicle, tracked, personnel 5) is a family of amphibious armored fighting vehicles used by the Philippine Marine Corps and, formerly, the United States Marine Corps. It was designed by the BorgWarner company and built by FMC (Food Machinery Corporation) along with a few other companies. It was first accepted into service in 1956. Some 1,124 basic units were produced, plus the specialist variants, and many saw action in the Vietnam War.

History
The LVTP-5 was an evolution of the LVT-1 to LVT-4 World War II-era landing vehicle tracked series, but was considerably larger and could carry 30-34 combat-armed troops. A smaller design based on the M59 APC was also produced as the LVT-6, but only a few were built.

The LVTP-5 was replaced in service by the LVT-7 family.

The most common type was the LVTP-5, an armored personnel carrier, with mine-sweeper, command, recovery and fire support variants, the latter mounted a 105 mm howitzer. An anti-aircraft version was prototyped, but never saw service.

As of the mid-2010s, the sole remaining state user of the LVTH-6 was the Philippines, who used four of them for their naval infantry force. As of 2013, Philippine LVTH-6s came in a "digital"-style camouflage pattern.

Variants
 LVTP-5 (landing vehicle tracked, personnel) - armored personnel carrier
 LVTC-5 (landing vehicle, tracked, command) - command vehicle
 LVTH-6 (landing vehicle, tracked, howitzer) - fire support variant armed with M49 105 mm howitzer. Two hundred and ten units built.
 LVTR-1 (landing vehicle, tracked, recovery) - recovery vehicle. Sixty-five units built.
 LVTE-1 (landing vehicle, tracked, engineer) - mine-sweeper. Forty-one units built.
 LVTAA-X1 (landing vehicle, tracked, anti aircraft) - anti-aircraft variant, to be fitted with the turret of the M42 Duster. Only prototype built.

Operators

Current
 
,50 purchased in 1975. Four still in service as of 2016
 

Former

See also
 G-numbers

References

Further reading
David Koller, LVTP5 Landing Vehicle Tracked Personnel 5, 2016, Highgloss Publishing, .
 SNL G277
 Steven Zaloga, Terry Hadler, Michael Badrocke - Amtracs: US Amphibious Assault Vehicles, 1999, Osprey Publishing (New Vanguard 30), .

External links

Federation of American Scientists
LVTP5 Museum page
American Fighting Vehicle database

Amphibious armoured personnel carriers
Armored personnel carriers of the Philippines
Armored personnel carriers of the United States
Tracked amphibious vehicles
Military vehicles introduced in the 1950s